Subterfuge may refer to:

Music
"Subterfuge", track from The Hidden Land album by Béla Fleck and the Flecktones
"Subterfuge", track from Demolition (Judas Priest album)
"Subterfuge", track from Black Fire (album)
"Subterfuge", track from Oppressing the Masses
"Subterfuge", track from Run Cold album from Diva Destruction
"Subterfuge", track from Zeno Beach
"Subterfuge", a music video by Dååth

Film
Subterfuge (1968 film), a British film starring Joan Collins
Subterfuge (1996 film), an American film starring Matt McColm
Subterfuge (1912 film), an American silent film
"The Subterfuge", an episode from The Fatal Ring, a 1917 American action film serial

Other
"Subterfuge", a 1959 science fiction story by Charles Eric Maine
"Subterfuge", a 1943 short story by Ray Bradbury published in Astonishing Stories
Subterfuge (video game), a 2015 mobile game
 A nickname for the United Kingdom's Central Government War Headquarters

See also
Deception